Cusuma is a genus of moths in the family Geometridae.

Species
 Cusuma flavifusa Hampson, 1893
 Cusuma limbata Moore, 1879
 Cusuma vilis (Walker, 1854)

References
 Cusuma at Markku Savela's Lepidoptera and Some Other Life Forms
 Natural History Museum Lepidoptera genus database

Geometrinae
Geometridae genera